Udea tenoalis is a moth in the family Crambidae. It was described by Eugene G. Munroe in 1974. It is found in Chile.

References

tenoalis
Moths described in 1974
Endemic fauna of Chile